Udaya Soundari (born 28 April 1991), is a Singaporean Indian actress and television presenter. She has appeared in films such as Parandhu Sella Vaa (2016) and A Yellow Bird (2016). She is also the first person in Singapore to win three awards in one year at the Pradhana Vizha festival.

Personal life
Udaya was born and raised in Singapore. She also has a younger sister who is also a television actress called Malene.

In 2015, an adult sex tape was spread throughout social media which raised concerns among Udaya's supporters of a woman looking like Udaya in the video. However after research in the video was done, it was declared that Udaya wasn't involved in the tape.

Filmography

Television

Films

Awards and nominations

References

External links
 

Living people
People from Singapore
Singaporean people of Tamil descent
Singaporean people of Indian descent
Singaporean actresses
Tamil television presenters
1991 births